"World of Our Love" is a song written by Australian group Client Liaison and co-produced with Flight Facilities. It was released on 19 April 2016 as the lead single from their debut studio album, Diplomatic Immunity (2016). The single was certified gold in Australia in 2018.

Reception
"World of Our Love" peaked at No. 11 on the ARIA Hitseekers Singles chart; it was certified gold, for shipment of 35000 copies, by Australian Recording Industry Association (ARIA) in January 2018.

Sosefina Fuamoli from The Music AU observed, "With some well timed saxophone blending in with the shimmery and uber-danceable beat, 'World of Our Love' is inviting, fun and excellently executed."

Music video
The song's music video was directed by Mike Greaney and Aaron McDonald with art direction from Jarrod Prince. It was released on 11 May 2016.
The animated music video was made in collaboration with Oh Yeah Wow and is a tribute to the opulence of Australian life and culture. Greaney and McDonald described how, "It's an absurdist pastiche of cultist and Australiana iconography, retro-future architecture, and exotic wild animals. We packaged these ideas up in a visual style that was heavily inspired by late 80s Masters of the Universe cartoons and then basically just had a blast coming up with the most outrageous ideas we could think of within that frame work."

Charts

Certifications

Release history

References

2016 singles
2016 songs
Client Liaison songs